Tommy Mikkelsen is a Canadian neuro-oncologist who is president and scientific director of the Ontario Brain Institute and co-director of the Hermelin Brain Center at Henry Ford Hospital, Detroit.

He completed his MD at the University of Calgary in 1983. He has an h-index of 72.

References

Year of birth missing (living people)
Living people
University of Calgary alumni